John Hanson (died c. 1860) was an African American politician in Liberia. He served in Colonial Council and as a senator from Grand Bassa County following Liberia's independence in 1847. He was born into slavery, but he purchased his freedom and emigrated from Baltimore to Liberia at age thirty-six. In Liberia, he joined the growing mercantile class. He also served as Commissary in the same county for several years, furnishing a house for the storage of arms and ammunition.
Hanson died in 1860, and was mourned as a "faithful and patriotic servant" by Liberian president Stephen Allen Benson.

Senator Hanson has sometimes been misidentified as being John Hanson of Maryland, a white politician who served as a President of the Continental Congress during the American Revolution.

References 

Americo-Liberian people
Members of the Senate of Liberia
Year of birth uncertain
1860 deaths
People from Grand Bassa County